The 1971 U.S. Open was the 71st U.S. Open, held June 17–21 at the East Course of Merion Golf Club in Ardmore, Pennsylvania, a suburb west of Philadelphia. Lee Trevino, the 1968 champion, won his second U.S. Open, defeating Jack Nicklaus by three strokes in an 18-hole playoff. It was the second of Trevino's six major titles and the second of four times in which Nicklaus was the runner-up to Trevino in a major; Nicklaus won his third U.S. Open the following year.

The U.S. Open was just part of an outstanding year for Trevino in 1971 and following this playoff win, his confidence soared. Two weeks later he won the Canadian Open in a  the next week the British Open, and became the first to win those three national opens in the same  only Tiger Woods has done it since, in 2000. Trevino won six times on tour in 1971 with two majors and was PGA Player of the Year. He was named athlete of the year by the Associated Press and Sporting News, and was the Sports Illustrated "Sportsman of the Year." Trevino was the first to win the U.S. and British Opens in the same year in 18 years, last accomplished by Ben Hogan in 1953. The others were Gene Sarazen in 1932 and amateur Bobby Jones in 1926 and 1930, his grand slam year. Subsequent winners of both were Tom Watson in 1982 and Woods in 2000.

For Jim Simons, a Pennsylvania native entering his senior year at Wake Forest, his fifth-place finish remains the most recent top ten by an amateur at the U.S. Open. It is the best since Nicklaus' tie for fourth in 1961, following his runner-up finish the year before at age 20 in 1960. The last victory by an amateur at any major was at the U.S. Open in 1933, won by Johnny Goodman of Omaha. Bobby Jones won four U.S. Opens as an amateur, the last in 1930 was part of his grand slam.

This was the third U.S. Open played at Merion, which previously hosted in 1934 and 1950. A fourth was played in 1981, and a fifth in 2013.

Course layout

East Course 

Source:

Lengths of the course for previous U.S. Opens:
1950: , par 70
1934: , par 70
Before the 1971 championship the course was measured for the first time in decades using more accurate equipment and found the previous yardage of 6694 was incorrect and changed to 6544 yards.

Past champions in the field

Made the cut

Missed the cut

Source:

Round summaries

First round
Thursday, June 17, 1971

Source:

Second round
Friday, June 18, 1971

Source:

Third round
Saturday, June 19, 1971

Four strokes back after 36 holes, amateur Simons shot a five-under 65 in the third round, one off the U.S. Open record, to take the 54-hole lead. He got out to a fast start on Saturday, and was five-under for the round after ten holes.  Simons played even-par on the last eight and ended with seven birdies and two bogeys to lead Nicklaus by two strokes.

Source:

Scorecard
Third round

Cumulative tournament scores, relative to par
{|class="wikitable" span = 50 style="font-size:85%;
|-
|style="background: Pink;" width=10|
|Birdie
|style="background: PaleGreen;" width=10|
|Bogey
|}
Source:

Final round
Sunday, June 20, 1971

In the final pairing with Nicklaus, 21-year-old Simons retained the lead through the first nine holes of the final round, and was one shot back on the 18th tee. Needing a birdie to tie, his tee shot found the thick rough; a double bogey six yielded a 76 and he finished three strokes back in a tie for fifth place. Trevino took the lead with a birdie at 14, but then missed an 8-footer (2.4 m) for par at the last. He backed off before the putt after a disturbance in the gallery. Nicklaus'  birdie putt for the win on the 72nd green also narrowly missed, and settled for par to force a Monday afternoon playoff. Bob Rosburg also had a chance to join the playoff with a birdie at the last, but he three-putted for bogey and finished two shots back.

(a) denotes amateur

Scorecard
Final round

Cumulative tournament scores, relative to par
{|class="wikitable" span = 50 style="font-size:85%;
|-
|style="background: Pink;" width=10|
|Birdie
|style="background: PaleGreen;" width=10|
|Bogey
|style="background: Green;" width=10|
|Double bogey
|}
Source:

Playoff 
Monday, June 21, 1971

Prior to the playoff, the first at the U.S. Open since 1966, Trevino and Nicklaus, both 31, were involved in a famous incident on the first tee involving a toy rubber snake. Trevino had acquired it at a zoo gift shop and used it earlier in the week along with a pith helmet and hatchet during a whimsical photo shoot emphasizing Merion's thick and penal rough. Hot and humid in the early afternoon, Trevino reached into his golf bag for a fresh glove and came across the snake and took it out to entertain the crowd. Nicklaus then asked him to toss it over, which Trevino did. Nicklaus picked it up, laughed with the crowd, then threw it back to Trevino. It would later be written that Trevino had tossed the snake at Nicklaus in an attempt to unnerve his rival; in reality, Nicklaus was the one who asked him to throw the snake.

When the playoff began, Trevino bogeyed the first hole and Nicklaus took the lead, but then hit two poor bunker shots on the next two, allowing Trevino to open a two-stroke lead. Although Nicklaus cut into the lead several times, to within one stroke as late as the 12th tee, Trevino never relinquished it. He carded a 68 to Nicklaus' 71 to win by three. Nicklaus won his third U.S. Open the following year in 1972 at Pebble Beach, and a record-tying fourth at Baltusrol at age 40 in 1980.

Television coverage by ABC Sports for the Monday playoff was scheduled for just an hour, beginning at 4:30 p.m. EDT. A 35-minute weather delay after the sixth hole allowed for lengthened coverage.

Scorecard
Playoff

{|class="wikitable" span = 50 style="font-size:85%;
|-
|style="background: Pink;" width=10|
|Birdie
|style="background: PaleGreen;" width=10|
|Bogey
|style="background: Green;" width=10|
|Double bogey
|}
Source:

References

External links

USOpen.com - 1971 
Trenham Golf History  – 1971 U.S. Open
You Tube.com - Rubber snake at first tee of playoff

U.S. Open (golf)
Golf in Pennsylvania
U.S. Open
U.S. Open (golf)
U.S. Open (golf)